Trifurcula moravica is a moth of the family Nepticulidae. It was described by Zdenek Laštuvka and Ales Laštuvka in 1994. It is known from Austria, the Czech Republic and Italy.

References

Nepticulidae
Moths of Europe
Moths described in 1994